The United States Australian Football League (USAFL) is the governing body for Australian rules football in the United States. It was conceived in 1996 and organized in 1997. It is based in Sun Prairie, Wisconsin.

As of 2011, there were over 1,000 registered USAFL players. There are 50 member clubs, of which 48 have men's teams (all except North Star Blue Ox and the Centennial Tigers) and 27 have women's teams.
Most of the football clubs in the United States have a traditional 18-a-side team for representative purposes and multiple 9-a-side teams running in a local league.

Each year the USAFL holds a National club championship, a tournament open to all clubs across the nation, the largest of its type in the world for the sport. In addition to the Nationals, the USAFL holds major regional tournaments including the Central, East and West regional tournaments.

The USAFL selects the national men's (USA Revolution) and women's (USA Freedom) teams for competitions such as the Australian Football International Cup and the 49th Parallel Cup.

History

The first match between two local US clubs was played in 1996 between Cincinnati and Louisville.
In the first year the Mid American Australian Football League was formed.
Many of the local players had found out about the game in the 1980s on television via the then-nascent ESPN cable network.  Although the local game grew, ESPN no longer broadcast AFL matches, and in response the lobby group, Australian Football Association of North America was formed.

In 1997, the first club national championships were held in Cincinnati. Nashville hosted the first Australian Grand Final Festival in the same year.  The United States Australian Football League (USAFL) was formed in 1997 to govern the code in the country.

The involvement of many well-known Australians has helped boost the relations between the USAFL and AFL. In the early days, Paul Roos was a key figure.

Robert DiPierdomenico, Leigh Matthews and Michael Voss are official USAFL ambassadors.

National teams
USAFL is responsible for the co-ordination of the National Teams, the USA Revolution men's team and the USA Freedom women's team.
The team plays in international tournaments and exhibition matches against other countries. National team players are selected from the best US-born players from the club teams across the country.

With close proximity to Canada, the Revolution & Freedom participate in the annual 49th Parallel Cup against Canada each year except for years of the International Cup in Australia.

The Revolution competed in the 2002 Australian Football International Cup, finishing 5th out of 11 countries and in the 2005 Australian Football International Cup finishing 3rd out of 10 countries. They competed in the 2008 Australian Football International Cup where the Revolution finished 7th out of 16 countries. At the 2011 Australian Football International Cup, the Revolution finished 4th in an increased field of 18 countries. The Revolution finished 8th at the 2014 Australian Football International Cup, again with 18 countries participating.

Domestic tournaments and competitions
USAFL National Championships
USAFL East vs West
49th Parallel Cup

USAFL clubs and representative sides

Football Map

USAFL Teams

Associate Members (via AFL Canada)

Previous clubs

Affiliated leagues
Mid American Australian Football League
Eastern Australian Football League
Southern California Australian Football League

See also

Metro Footy
Women's Australian Football Association

References

External links

 
Australian rules football governing bodies outside Australia
Aus
Sports organizations established in 1997